CKG may refer to:
 Chongqing Jiangbei International Airport
 CKG48